Clarks Landing may refer to:

Clarks Landing, Indiana
Clarks Landing, Atlantic County, New Jersey
Clarks Landing, Ocean County, New Jersey